Dave Benson Phillips (born 3 February 1965) is a British entertainer, comic, children's television presenter and wrestler, best known for his work presenting Playhouse Disney (1998–2006) and The Fun Song Factory (1994–1999). He also presented the popular CBBC game show Get Your Own Back, which he now tours with around the UK.

Career
Benson Phillips became interested in showbusiness while working as an usher at the Polka Children's Theatre in Wimbledon, London, and began his career as an entertainer by busking and performing at children's parties. He subsequently went on to work for Pontins as a Bluecoat, and a Children's Uncle for Haven Holidays. While working at Haven, a talent scout saw him perform, and he was invited by BBC Manchester to audition for Play School. His audition was successful, but the show was pulled out of production shortly after he signed the contract; however, it was recommissioned as Playbus (later renamed to Playdays), which ran for nine years.

In 1991, he was given his own show, Get Your Own Back, which was shown on BBC One (and later CBBC) between 1991 and 2003, and was a game show consisting of one child contestant and an adult (such as a relative or teacher) who, in the child's eyes, had done something unreasonable, and for which the child wanted revenge. In 1999, the show was nominated for a BAFTA.

In 1996, he was given his own show on ITV, Wake Up in the Wild Room. Phillips operates Chester Benson Productions, a production company which provides entertainment, removals and transportation services, and offers inflatables for hire, such as bouncy castles.

Since May 2012, he annually co-hosts Let's Rock The Moor! alongside fellow broadcaster Pat Sharp. During the summer, he appeared as a panelist on Big Brother's Bit on the Side on Channel 5.

In 2013, Phillips made a guest appearance in Sooty. Phillips plays himself in an award-winning mockumentary webseries called Getting Back with Dave Benson Phillips which began in 2017. The series by Andrew River was invited to showcase at MCM London Comic Con and the cast includes Pat Sharp and Ewen MacIntosh. The series and spin off In Production are available to watch on YouTube. He has most recently been seen working as a professional wrestler, after having also done so whilst working as a blue coat at Pontins.

Death hoax and other online attacks 
In 2009, Benson Phillips was the victim of a death hoax perpetrated across the internet which maintained that he had died in a car crash. There were other false rumours that he was presenting on a soft porn TV sex line, and that he was no longer being hired because he had suffered a nervous breakdown. In 2017 Phillips spoke with the Chair of the Culture, Media and Sport Select Committee on an inquiry into fake news.

Filmography

A CBeebies Christmas Carol
Big Brother's Bit on the Side
Bitesize (Himself)
Bad Robots
Cats' Eyes
CBBC's Proms in the Park
Celebrity Juice
 Come Dine with Me (Himself)
 Da Bungalow Clips’ 2021 Christmas Day Video Message
Dream Street
Fun Song Factory
Get Your Own Back
Getting Back with Dave Benson Phillips
Go For It!
Is That A Fact?
Jack in the Box
The Last Leg
The Legend of Nic and Joe
Nick Jr. 
Petswap
Planet Cook
Playdays
Playhouse Disney UK (Presenter)
Q & A
Rat Kan II
Sooty
Wake Up in the Wild Room
Words & Pictures – The Gruffalo Story

VHS videos and DVDs

A Day Full Of Surprises and Songs – Presenter 
Bourne Leisure Health and Safety Film
Dave and the Animals;;
First Bible Stories
Fun Song Factory
Get Up and Go!
Get Your Own Back
Makaton Nursery Rhymes
My Favourite Nursery Rhymes
Roald Dahl – The Enormous Crocodile – Narrator
The Magical World of Animals
Wiz Waz's World of 123
Wiz Waz's World of ABC
Wiz Waz's World Nursery Rhymes
Wiz Waz's World of Starting School
Wow! That's What I Call Nursery Rhymes

Video games
Smarties: Meltdown (2006) – Voice of "Big Blue"

References

External links
Dave Benson Phillips' website

1965 births
Living people
BBC television presenters
Black British television personalities
British children's entertainers
British game show hosts
GMTV presenters and reporters
Place of birth missing (living people)